Shriners Auditorium is a 2,650-seat indoor arena located in Wilmington, Massachusetts.  It was built in 1977 as the headquarters for the Aleppo Shriners, who had been based in Boston, Massachusetts since 1882.  The Aleppo Shriners still own the auditorium today.  It is also the home of the Boston Derby Dames roller derby league.
  
Its main lobby features  of space. It can seat up to 4,150 for boxing, wrestling, mixed martial arts and concerts, among other events. As of February 2009, all mma events promoted by World Championship Fighting have been hosted there. Trade shows, sporting events, conventions, banquets and the Shrine Circus are also held at the facility.

The building is wheelchair accessible and has a  ceiling height.  Because of its location in an office park off I-93, there is plenty of parking, including 1,500 in its own parking lot.

External links
Aleppo Shriners
Shriners Auditorium

1977 establishments in Massachusetts
Buildings and structures in Wilmington, Massachusetts
Convention centers in Massachusetts
Indoor arenas in Massachusetts
Sports venues in Middlesex County, Massachusetts
Sports venues completed in 1977
Shriners
Clubhouses in Massachusetts